The Ron Shulamit Conservatory is a music conservatory in Israel.

History

Shulamit Conservatory
Among the teachers were noted musicians such as Moshe Hupenko, a famous violinist from Geneva, invited from Europe for the express purpose of teaching at Shulamit. After Mrs. Ruppin's passing, Mr. Hupenko took over as director, in which capacity he served for 40 years. The conservatory moved to Tel Aviv and became a focal point for residents there. At the time, 1,800 people lived in Tel Aviv and 37% of the city's children studied at the conservatory.

Famous musicians who taught at Shulamit include Paul Ben-Haim, Yoel Engel, Yosef Acharon, Yariv Ezrachi, and Telma Yelin.

Among Shulamit Conservatory's most famous students are Itzhak Perlman, Pnina Salzman, Ivry Gitlis, Shimon Mishori, Yifrah Ne'eman, Yehoshua Epstein, Amichai Gross, Rami Bar-Niv, Varda Nishri and even Moshe Shertok, better known as Prime Minister Moshe Sharett.

In 1923 the Shulamit Conservatory Orchestra accompanied Mordechai's Golinkin's production of La Traviata, the first opera performed in pre-state Israel.

Ron Conservatory, after 1968 Ron Shulamit
Music schools sprouted all over the country to address the great demand produced by refugees who arrived during World War II. One of the more notable ones was Ron Conservatory, established and directed by the violinist Yariv Ezrachi, himself a graduate of the Shulamit Conservatory. Famous musicians who studied at Ron include Daniel Benyamini and Shlomo Mintz. In 1968 Ezrachi added the name "Shulamit" to the title of his school, in order to perpetuate Shulamit's illustrious history. Ezrahi's daughter Ofra Broshi later opened a branch in Jerusalem, and today the Ron Shulamit Conservatory operates a coed branch in Bet Hakerem, and one for Orthodox girls in Har Nof.

Mission and projects
The conservatory's mission is to make music and all its benefits, available to everyone, regardless of religious/ethnic background, age, gender, socio-economic status, physical, mental or emotional disabilities. Free open houses are held on a regular basis in addition to performances in nursing homes, community centers, fundraisers for charitable organizations and explained concerts in schools, as part of the goal of enriching the cultural life of Jerusalem residents.

Ron Shulamit offers music classes of the highest caliber, by renowned musicians, for a wide variety of instruments, maintains several ensembles (wind, string and Baroque), and three orchestras. They offer early childhood music education, and a BA program in music education for girls (the only program of its kind in the world), providing them with a higher education, and a career. Over 400 students train at the conservatory each year, some going on to win awards for achievement in their field in national competitions.

The conservatory's "Jewish Music Renaissance Project" researches, collects, records and performs traditional music pieces from Jewish communities around the globe.

The conservatory provides music therapy to children with disabilities and emotional problems. It employs many immigrant musicians, thereby aiding in their absorption process.

Performing ensembles
The performing ensembles include:

CameRon Student Orchestra – Established in 1995 in an effort to bring people closer to classical music, this chamber orchestra performs a broad repertoire including pieces written specially for them by Israel Edelson and performed as part of the Jewish Music Renaissance Project. Students in the BA program have a chance to conduct the orchestra during rehearsals and performances, and occasionally play with the Zmora orchestra. The state music commission has praised CameRon for its uniqueness and importance.

Zmora – the only professional all-female string orchestra in Israel recognized by the Ministry of Culture. Established in 2002, it has 15 musicians. Educational concerts in schools, and benefit concerts for charity organizations, as well as free concerts in nursing homes and areas hurt by acts of terror, are all part of the orchestra's unique contribution to the community, and beyond as Zmora performs in the cultural and geographical periphery.

AccordiRon – A crowd favorite, this student accordion orchestra, is often invited to perform throughout the country. As part of the Jewish Music Renaissance Project, the AccordiRon repertoire continues to grow, and includes their own CD of Jewish folk music.

References

External links

Tel Aviv Municipal Archive (in Hebrew)

Music schools in Israel